The Vinton Building is a residential high-rise located at 600 Woodward Avenue (at the northeast corner of Woodward and Congress Street) in Downtown Detroit, Michigan. It stands next to the First National Building, across Woodward Avenue from Chase Tower (currently known as The Qube) and the Guardian Building, and across Congress Street from One Detroit Center. It was designated a Michigan State Historic Site in 1982 and listed on the National Register of Historic Places in 1983.

Description

The building, designed by Albert Kahn and completed in 1917, stands 12 stories tall, 172 ft. (52 m), with 2 basement levels for a total of 14 floors. Its primary uses are for offices and retail. The building was constructed in the neo-classical architectural style, and contains mainly terra cotta as its main material. It features a peaked parapet wall on the front façade, reminiscent of classical temples.

Renovation
The Vinton underwent a reconstruction in 2006, turning the building into a loft building. The renovation included commercial space on the first two floors, and one loft on each of the additional ten floors. The renovation began in December 2005, and included a conversion of the basement into a parking level, ground floor retail, second floor commercial space, with the top ten floors being converted into multiple condominium units, one  or two per floor. As of 2010, renovation has stalled and the building has yet to open.

 Architect: Albert Kahn
 Architect (renovation): Archive D.S.
 Owner:  Vinton Building, LLC
 General Contractor (renovation): The Garrison Company

Dan Gilbert, owner of dozens of Downtown Detroit properties, purchased the building in 2013.

References

Further reading

External links

Google Maps location of the Vinton Building

Historic Detroit — Vinton Building

Residential skyscrapers in Detroit
Residential buildings on the National Register of Historic Places in Michigan
Office buildings on the National Register of Historic Places in Michigan
Office buildings in Detroit
Historic district contributing properties in Michigan
Rock Ventures
National Register of Historic Places in Detroit
Albert Kahn (architect) buildings
Buildings and structures completed in 1917
Woodward Avenue